Seven Immortals can refer to:
 Seven Immortals (Chinese mythology)
 Seven Immortals (gang)
 Seven Immortals / Chiranjivi (Hindu Mythology)